Tomás Laighléis (1895 - 1984) was a traditional Irish Seanchaí or storyteller.  

A native of Menlo, County Galway, Laighléis was a seanchaí of local history and of Fianna tales. A selection of his recorded tales, was published in 1977 but contains only a fraction of his output.

See also

 Robin Lawless, died 1260.

References

 Seanchas Thomáis Laighléis, ed. Tomás de Bhaldraithe, 1977.
 Social History and Oral Art - Reflections on the Collected Folklore of Menlo, near Galway City, Cian Marnell, pp. 134–148, Journal of the Galway Archaeological and Historical Society, volume 59, 2007.
 Lawless of Connacht, Adrian James Martyn, p. 101, Journal of the Genealogical Society of Ireland, vol. 12, 2011.

Local historians
People from County Galway
20th-century Irish historians
21st-century Irish historians